Eugene L. Smith (November 28, 1911 – October 3, 1995) was an American former Negro league infielder who played in the 1940s.

A native of Key West, Florida, Smith made his Negro leagues debut in 1941 with the Jacksonville Red Caps. He went on to play for the Cleveland Buckeyes, and finished his career in 1946 with the Indianapolis Clowns.

References

External links
 and Seamheads

1911 births
1995 deaths
Cleveland Buckeyes players
Indianapolis Clowns players
Jacksonville Red Caps players
Baseball infielders
Baseball players from Florida
People from Key West, Florida
20th-century African-American sportspeople